Emamzadeh Sadat (also Romanized as Emāmzādeh Sādāt) is a village in Sarfaryab Rural District, Sarfaryab District, Charam County, Kohgiluyeh and Boyer-Ahmad Province, Iran. At the 2006 census, its population was 363, in 80 families.

References 

Populated places in Charam County